Route 165 is a  numbered state highway in the U.S. state of Rhode Island. Its western terminus is a continuation of Connecticut Route 165 at the Connecticut border, and its eastern terminus is at Rhode Island Route 3 in Exeter. It runs entirely on Ten Rod Road, where one rod is 16.5 feet and so ten rods is 165 feet, matching the route number.

Route description
Route 165 enters Rhode Island on a causeway over Beach Pond.  It travels east through the woods along Ten Rod Road.  Shortly before its eastern end, the highway passes beneath Interstate 95, however Route 165 does not connect directly to the Interstate.  It ends at an intersection with Nooseneck Hill Road, which carries Route 3.

Major intersections

References

External links

2019 Highway Map, Rhode Island

165
Transportation in Washington County, Rhode Island